Václav Pilař (born 13 October 1988) is a Czech professional footballer who plays as a winger for Viktoria Plzeň. He has also been capped internationally for the Czech Republic.

Club career
Pilař joined Plzeň on loan from Hradec Králové at the beginning of the 2011–12 Czech First League season.

After declining to sign a contract with Plzeň in November 2011, Pilař was reported to have signed a contract with German side VfL Wolfsburg. In January 2012, it was announced that Pilař would join VfL Wolfsburg in the summer but would be staying in the Czech Republic in the lead up to the UEFA Euro 2012 tournament.

He was injured in the summer of 2012 and didn't play a single match for Wolfsburg during the 2012–13 season. In the summer of 2013, Pilař joined SC Freiburg on loan. Having been out for 14 months, Pilař returned to action in an October 2013 friendly match for Freiburg against 2. Bundesliga side Sandhausen.

International career
Pilař made his debut for the Czech Republic on 4 June 2011. He scored his first senior international goal against Montenegro in the UEFA Euro 2012 qualifying play-offs in November 2011.

He scored the Czech Republic's first goal in their opening game of the UEFA Euro 2012 tournament against Russia when they were 2–0 down. In the second match of the tournament, Pilař scored the winning goal in the 2–1 victory against Greece, earning the Man of the match accolade in the process.

Career statistics

Club

International
Scores and results list Czech Republic's goal tally first, score column indicates score after each Pilař goal.

References

External links
 
 
 

1988 births
Living people
People from Chlumec nad Cidlinou
Czech footballers
Association football wingers
Czech Republic international footballers
Czech Republic youth international footballers
Czech Republic under-21 international footballers
UEFA Euro 2012 players
Czech First League players
Bundesliga players
FC Hradec Králové players
FC Viktoria Plzeň players
VfL Wolfsburg players
SC Freiburg players
FC Slovan Liberec players
SK Sigma Olomouc players
FK Jablonec players
Czech expatriate footballers
Czech expatriate sportspeople in Germany
Expatriate footballers in Germany
Sportspeople from the Hradec Králové Region